Trees of Eternity was a musical collaboration between Finnish guitarist Juha Raivio (Swallow the Sun) and Sweden-based, South African-born singer Aleah Stanbridge. Their music is often described as down-tempo, doom/death-inspired melancholia with angelic female vocals.

History 
Trees of Eternity was formed when guitarist Juha Raivio and singer Aleah got together in the studio to work on the song "Lights on the Lake" for the upcoming Swallow the Sun album New Moon. The plan was to feature Aleah's vocals on part of the song already prepared by Juha, but when they instead began to experiment with a vocal line Aleah had written for the occasion the session quickly headed off in a new direction and the project took on a life of its own.

The pair released a four-song promo online, and have since completed and recorded the songs for their upcoming debut album.

Trees of Eternity also signed a publishing deal with UK-based AMF Publishing.

The full album line-up of Trees of Eternity includes, apart from the two original members, Fredrik Norrman (October Tide, ex-Katatonia), Mattias Norrman (October Tide, ex-Katatonia) and Kai Hahto (Wintersun, Swallow the Sun, Nightwish), as well as some acclaimed guest musicians.

On April 18, 2016, singer Aleah Stanbridge died from cancer at age 39. Two days later, Juha wrote on Facebook that the album has been ready to be released for a while and that the plans are still in motion. He was also planning to release Aleah's solo songs. On August 11, 2016, the band's debut album, Hour of the Nightingale, was announced to be released on November 11.

Members
Juha Raivio - guitars (2009–2016)
Kai Hahto - drums (2013–2016)
Fredrik Normann - guitars (2013–2016)
Mattias Normann - bass (2014–2016)
Aleah Stanbridge - vocals (2009–2016; died 2016)

Discography

Demos
 Black Ocean  (2013)

Studio albums
 Hour of The Nightingale (2016)

Notes

References
 MetalStorm.net
 Blabbermouth.net

External links
 https://www.facebook.com/treesofeternity

2013 establishments in Sweden
Swedish doom metal musical groups
Musical groups established in 2013